ABC Supply Stadium is a baseball park in Beloit, Wisconsin. It is primarily to be used for baseball, and is the home field of the Beloit Sky Carp, the Midwest League affiliate of the Miami Marlins. It replaced Harry C. Pohlman Field as the home for the Sky Carp beginning on August 3, 2021. ABC Supply holds the naming rights to the stadium, although the terms and length of the deal have not been disclosed. ABC Supply is owned by Hendricks Properties, the primary developer of the stadium. The Sky Carp started the 2021 season at Pohlman Field before moving to the new ballpark. The first game at ABC Supply Stadium was August 3, 2021, against the Wisconsin Timber Rattlers.

Features
It features 3,850 seats and a grandstand containing concessions and a clubhouse that can be converted to banquet space similar to Fox Cities Stadium in Grand Chute. The field is artificial turf with dirt basepaths, that will help keep maintenance costs low and give the stadium the ability to host other types of events besides baseball. The location of the stadium is along the Rock River in downtown Beloit, a half a mile from the Beloit College. The site borders the Wisconsin/Illinois state line.

References

Baseball venues in Wisconsin
Buildings and structures in Rock County, Wisconsin
Minor league baseball venues
Tourist attractions in Rock County, Wisconsin
Sports venues completed in 2021
2021 establishments in Wisconsin

Beloit, Wisconsin
Midwest League ballparks